ZCBN/92.3 is an F.M. radio station broadcasting from the British Virgin Islands, owned by the Caribbean Broadcast Network. It broadcasts a variety of different kinds of music, described on its website as a mix of "pop, classic country, classic rock & easy listening...blended with reggae & calypso". Its sister station is ZBTV.

References

External links
FCC's list of stations on 92.3 MHz. ZCBN is at the bottom without a callsign.

Radio stations in the British Virgin Islands